The Beatrice Downtown Historic District in Beatrice, Nebraska is a historic district which was listed on the National Register of Historic Places in 2016.

It consists mainly of one- to three-story brick, wood and stone commercial buildings.  It includes four buildings already listed on the National Register:
Beatrice City Library, 
Beatrice Municipal Auditorium, 
Paddock/Kensington Hotel, and 
Schmuck Building.

References

External links

Historic districts on the National Register of Historic Places in Nebraska
National Register of Historic Places in Gage County, Nebraska
Architecture in Nebraska